Iceland competed in the Summer Olympic Games for the first time at the 1912 Summer Olympics in Stockholm, Sweden.  Olympic historians treat Iceland's results separate from those of Denmark despite Iceland's lack of independence at the time.

Athletics

A single athlete represented Iceland in athletics in the nation's debut at the sport and the Olympics. Halldórsson ran in the 100 metres, finishing fourth in his first round heat and not advancing to the semifinals.

Ranks given are within that athlete's heat for running events.

Wrestling

Greco-Roman

Iceland's Olympic debut also included a wrestler. Pétursson advanced to the fifth round of the light heavyweight competition on the strength of a 3–2 record (making Iceland one of a very few countries to have a winning record in wrestling). He did so despite facing four wrestlers from the dominant Finland team. Pétursson remains the only wrestler to represent Iceland at the Olympics.

References
Official Olympic Reports

Nations at the 1912 Summer Olympics
1912
Olympics